David R. Bryant (born May 8, 1936 in Greensboro, North Carolina, USA) is an internationally acclaimed organic chemist, having worked his entire thirty-nine-year 'early career' at Union Carbide.  He is inventor on some ninety patents, and a recipient of the Perkin Medal.  He currently is a member of Renewable Algal Energy (RAE) LLC, and is working to commercialize an algae-to-oil process utilizing RAE's patent pending technology.

Early life and education
Bryant grew up in Greensboro, North Carolina as one of seven children.  He began working at age ten and held various jobs throughout his youth. He was influenced by his high school science teacher, Arnold Bolen, and decided to pursue chemistry in college.   After graduation from high school, he earned a scholarship to Wake Forest University where he double-majored in chemistry and math. While at Wake Forest, he became a lab assistant and conducted synthetic research without the benefit of advanced instrumentation. After receiving his B.S. in 1958, Bryant pursued his Ph.D. at Duke University, with a fellowship from the National Science Foundation. Focusing on organic chemistry, with a minor in physics, he worked on the conversion of organic compounds into dianions under Charlie Hauser and received his doctorate in three years.

Early career: Union Carbide (1961–2000)
After earning his Ph.D. in 1961, he immediately went to work for Union Carbide Corporation.  He spent the next 39 years there, retiring in 2000. His career at Union Carbide was multi-dimensional:  he did fundamental research in organic chemistry in an industrial setting, contributing to Union Carbide's research and development program through his scientific innovations.  His early work involved the vinyl acetate process, research on rhodium and acrylic acid work. He served as a technical witness for Union Carbide in lawsuits involving maritime arbitration, industrial accidents, and participated with the firm's attorneys in intellectual property development. He was innovative in the development of a method of producing vinyl acetate without halide, and later benzyl acetate, acrylic acid, and rhodium triphenylphosphite in the oxo process. Union Carbide recognized his leadership skills as he was on the selection team for new chemists, mentored them throughout their careers and was instrumental in implementing continuing education programs for all employees. He received numerous promotions and was the youngest Union Carbide appointment to Senior Corporate Fellow. He won the prestigious Union Carbide Chairman's award three times. He is listed as inventor on more than 90 U.S. patents. Some thirteen of these were filed after his retirement from Union Carbide.  During his career at Union Carbide, he pursued approximately thirty-five different processes, nine of which reached commercial operation.  Currently there are 27 licensees worldwide using technology he assisted in developing. Dr. Bryant is considered to be one of the world's experts in separating product from precious metal with the use of a homogeneous catalyst.

Honors and awards
Bryant has received awards from his peers in the chemistry industry, the education community, and the state of West Virginia for his many professional and civic achievements.  In 1998, Bryant was awarded the Perkin Medal. The award recognized his accomplishments on a low pressure Oxo process for producing aldehydes.  Bryant was interviewed in 1998 by James G. Traynham of the Chemical Heritage Foundation's  Center for Oral History. He retired from Union Carbide in 2000 as a Senior Corporate Fellow.

1977	Kirkpatrick Award for low pressure Oxo process for the production of butyraldehyde from propylene and synthesis gas
1989 	Chemical Pioneer Award, American Institute of Chemists
1990	Honorary D.Sc., Wake Forest University
1991	Union Carbide Chairman's Award (1)
1992	Industrial Chemistry Award, American Chemical Society for outstanding technical accomplishments and leadership in industrial homogeneous catalysis and process development for the hydroformylation of olefins to Oxo products.
1993	Union Carbide Chairman's Award (2)
1993 	Carothers Award of the Delaware Section, American Chemical Society
1997	Union Carbide Chairman's Award (3)
1998	Perkin Medal, Society of Chemical Industry (American Section) for work on low pressure Oxo process for producing aldehydes.

Later career: Renewable Algal Energy (RAE, LLC) (2009 – present)
In 2009, Bryant joined Renewable Algal Energy (RAE, LLC) as an inventor and patent strategist. As a RAE team member, Dr. Bryant is using the same inventive skills and patent techniques that he employed in organic chemistry to work with non-GMO algae aquaculture, including  harvesting and extracting oil from algae. In this new capacity, he has already assisted RAE in filing several new patent applications in their state-of-the-art technology for harvesting and extracting oil from algae.  Another easy transition for Dr. Bryant in this new career has been embracing the 'green' philosophy of the RAE team. His lifelong work ethic has been that of 'working with nature to minimize nature' a philosophy also shared by RAE's scientific team. All aquaculture work conducted by RAE is with native strains of algae, non-GMO (not genetically modified), and with open ponds unlined with plastic. Thus, common problems of being unable to produce algae-to-oil at a commercially viable rate have been solved.

Civic activities
Bryant has been a teacher and mentor for young, newly hired chemists throughout his professional career. And he has extended that lifelong passion for helping others through education to his community. Bryant teaches remedial math, book carpentry and book electricity to disadvantaged women in a program called Step Up for Women in Charleston, West Virginia.  He assisted two individuals with their GED preparation, both of whom were successful. He is an avid photographer, with published work  and has shared his expertise by teaching free public classes in photography in Charleston. Bryant and his wife, Barbara, are both volunteers with the Community Music Association in Charleston, West Virginia.

Publications (partial list)

Bryant, D. R. (2006). Classical Homogeneous Catalyst Separation Technology. In Cole-Hamilton, D. & Tooze, R. (Eds.) . Catalyst Separation, Recovery and Recycling: Chemistry and Process Design (pp 9–37).  Dordrecht, The Netherlands: Springer.

Patents
90 American patents listed at the U.S. Patent Office.

References

External links
 
 

Living people
1936 births
People from Greensboro, North Carolina
Wake Forest University alumni
Duke University alumni
21st-century American chemists
Organic chemists